The Right Livelihood Award is an international award to "honour and support those offering practical and exemplary answers to the most urgent challenges facing us today." The prize was established in 1980 by German-Swedish philanthropist Jakob von Uexkull, and is presented annually in early December. An international jury, invited by the five regular Right Livelihood Award board members, decides the awards in such fields as environmental protection, human rights, sustainable development, health, education, and peace. The prize money is shared among the winners, usually numbering four, and is €200,000. Very often one of the four laureates receives an honorary award, which means that the other three share the prize money.

Although it is promoted as an "Alternative Nobel Prize", it is not a Nobel prize (i.e., a prize created by Alfred Nobel). It does not have any organizational ties at all to the awarding institutions of the Nobel Prize or the Nobel Foundation, unlike the Nobel Memorial Prize in Economic Sciences, which is not technically a Nobel prize but is administered by the Nobel Foundation.

However, the Right Livelihood Award is sometimes popularly associated with the Nobel prizes. The Right Livelihood Award committee arranged for awards to be made in the Riksdag of Sweden the day before the Nobel prizes and the economics prize are also awarded in Stockholm. However, the Right Livelihood Awards are understood as a critique of the traditional Nobel prizes. The establishment of the award followed a failed attempt to have the Nobel Foundation create new prizes in the areas of environmental protection, sustainable development and human rights. The prize has been awarded to a diverse group of people and organisations, including Wangari Maathai, Astrid Lindgren, Bianca Jagger, Mordechai Vanunu, Leopold Kohr, Arna Mer-Khamis, Felicia Langer, Petra Kelly, Survival International, Amy Goodman, Catherine Hamlin, Memorial, Edward Snowden, Daniel Ellsberg, and Greta Thunberg.

Ceremony
Since 1985, the ceremony has taken place in Stockholm's old Parliament building, in the days before the traditional Nobel prizes are awarded in the same city. A group of Swedish Parliamentarians from different parties host the ceremony; in 2009 European Commissioner Margot Wallström co-hosted the ceremony. However, in 2014 when it became public that one of the recipients of the 2014 prize was whistleblower Edward Snowden, the ceremonial group was disinvited from the Ministry for Foreign Affairs building in Stockholm.

In 2019, marking the 40th anniversary of the foundation of the Award, the ceremony was held at Cirkus before a live audience of more than 1,200 people. World-renowned artists such as José González and Ane Brun were among the night's performers.

Nature of the award
Some media refer to the prize as the Alternative Nobel Prize, and the prize is frequently understood as a critique of the traditional Nobel prizes. The prize differs significantly from the Nobel Prizes:
It is not a fulfillment of Alfred Nobel's bequest and thus not one of Nobel's own prizes.
It has an open nomination process (anyone can nominate anyone else, except close relatives or their own organizations).
It is not limited to specific categories.
The prize money is considerably lower than that of the Nobel Prize. Currently it is €200,000 compared to about €1,000,000 for a Nobel Prize.
The funds for the prizes now come from donations. while the Nobel Prizes come from the revenue of Alfred Nobel's fortune. The Nobel Memorial Prize in Economic Sciences (which is technically not a Nobel Prize) is financed by the Sveriges Riksbank.

History

Jakob von Uexküll, a philanthropist, sold his stamp collection worth US$1 million, which provided the initial funding for the award. Before establishing the award in 1980, von Uexkull had tried to persuade the Nobel Foundation to establish new prizes to be awarded together with the Nobel Prizes. He suggested new prize categories to be created: one in ecology and one in development. Like the Nobel Economics Prize, this would have been possible with an amendment to the Nobel Foundation statutes and funding of the prize amount completely separate from Nobel's fortune. The Nobel Prize amount was 880,000 Swedish kronor at that time, which corresponded to US$195,000. However, as a result of the debate that followed the establishment of the Sveriges Riksbank Prize in Economic Sciences in Memory of Alfred Nobel (first awarded in 1969), the Nobel Foundation had decided not to associate the Nobel Prize with any additional awards, so von Uexküll's proposal was rejected.

From 1980 to 2021, the foundation presented awards to 186 laureates from 73 countries. Its self-described purpose is to bestow prizes and thus publicize the work of recipients' local solutions to worldwide problems.

Laureates

See also
 Right livelihood
 List of awards for contributions to society
 List of environmental awards
 List of human rights awards
 List of humanitarian and service awards
 List of civil awards and decorations

References

Bibliography
Pathiravitana, S. (2007-11-08). A Great Son of Lanka. Sri Lanka Daily News, 8 November 2007. A history of the award. Retrieved on 2008-06-03.

External links

Right Livelihood Laureates from Croatia, Thailand, and Burundi Discuss Their Battles for Social Justice – video report by Democracy Now!

Awards established in 1980
Awards for contributions to society
Civil awards and decorations
Environmental awards
Foundations based in Sweden
Governance and civic leadership awards
Human rights awards
Humanitarian and service awards
Peace awards
1980 establishments in Sweden